Morenci is a census-designated place (CDP) and company town in Greenlee County, Arizona, United States, and was founded by the Detroit Copper Mining Company of Arizona. The population was 2000 at the 2000 census and 1,489 at the 2010 census. The biggest employer in Morenci (and in nearby Clifton) and the owner of the town is Freeport-McMoRan, the owner of the Morenci Mine, the largest copper mining operation in North America, and one of the largest copper mines in the world. The town was a site of the Arizona Copper Mine Strike of 1983. The large open-pit mine is north of the town.

Geography
Morenci is located in central Greenlee County at  (33.049804, -109.327856). It lies on the northeaster border of the town of Clifton, the county seat. U.S. Route 191 (the Coronado Trail) passes through the northern part of the community, leading east and downhill into Clifton and north through the Apache National Forest  to Eagar.

Climate
This region experiences hot and dry summers, with average monthly high temperatures above 80 °F for seven months a year. According to the Köppen Climate Classification system, Morenci has a warm-summer Mediterranean climate, abbreviated "Csb" on climate maps.

Demographics

As of the census of 2000, there were 1,879 people, 672 households, and 454 families residing in the CDP. The racial makeup of the CDP was 68.0% White, 0.5% Black or African American, 2.1% Native American, 0.5% Asian, 25.0% from other races, and 3.9% from two or more races.  44.5% of the population were Hispanic or Latino of any race.

There were 672 households, out of which 45.7% had children under the age of 18 living with them, 56.7% were married couples living together, 6.1% had a female householder with no husband present, and 32.3% were non-families. 30.8% of all households were made up of individuals, and 0.7% had someone living alone who was 65 years of age or older.  The average household size was 2.80 and the average family size was 3.55.

In the CDP, the population was spread out, with 35.6% under the age of 18, 7.2% from 18 to 24, 34.4% from 25 to 44, 22.1% from 45 to 64, and 0.6% who were 65 years of age or older.  The median age was 30 years. For every 100 females, there were 119.0 males.  For every 100 females age 18 and over, there were 128.7 males.

The median income for a household in the CDP was $46,010, and the median income for a family was $54,583. Males had a median income of $41,875 versus $26,063 for females. The per capita income for the CDP was $18,695.  About 2.7% of families and 3.0% of the population were below the poverty line, including 2.9% of those under age 18 and none of those age 65 or over.

Economy
The economy of Morenci as well as that of the surrounding area is almost completely dependent on the Morenci Mine. Between 2003 and 2008, the worldwide rise in copper prices led the mine to double its work force to 4,000 employees and increase production by 55 percent to an average of one million tons of ore per day.

Several hundred new homes were built, leading to a boom in the construction industry. All the homes in Morenci, new and old, remain owned by Freeport-McMoRan.

Education
It is in the Morenci Unified School District.

Notable people
Ettore DeGrazia, Southwestern Impressionist painter
The Marines of Morenci were the nine graduates of Morenci High who enlisted as a group in the Marine Corps. Their service began on Independence Day, 1966. Only three returned home.
Christine Nofchissey McHorse, Diné ceramic artist and sculptor

See also
Phelps Dodge Corporation, former owner of the mine, acquired by Freeport-McMoRan in 2007

References

Further reading
 Conger, W.C., 1987, History of the Clifton-Morenci District, in History of Mining in Arizona, vol. 1. Full text:

External links

Census-designated places in Greenlee County, Arizona
Mining communities in Arizona
Safford, Arizona micropolitan area
Company towns in Arizona